Albert Kowert (born 28 December 1989) is a German coxswain. He won a gold medal at the 2010 World Rowing Championships in Karapiro with the lightweight men's eight.

References

1989 births
Living people
German male rowers
World Rowing Championships medalists for Germany
Coxswains (rowing)